Vohimena is a town and commune in Madagascar. It belongs to the district of Amparafaravola, which is a part of Alaotra-Mangoro Region. The population of the commune was estimated to be approximately 8,000 in 2001 commune census.

Primary and junior level secondary education are available in town. The majority 80% of the population of the commune are farmers, while an additional 2% receives their livelihood from raising livestock. The most important crop is rice, while other important products are sugarcane and tobacco.  Industry and services provide employment for 3% and 10% of the population, respectively. Additionally fishing employs 5% of the population. Natural parks and nature preserves provide tourists with incentive to visit.

References and notes 

Populated places in Alaotra-Mangoro